Carmen, la de Triana (Carmen, the girl from Triana) is a 1938 Spanish/German musical film directed by Florián Rey and starring Imperio Argentina, Rafael Rivelles and Manuel Luna. It was a Spanish-language version of the 1938 film Nights in Andalusia based on the opera Carmen by Georges Bizet.

Triana is a neighbourhood of Seville.

Plot
The movie takes place in Seville in 1835. Carmen, a gypsy woman, intends to enter the barracks to give Antonio Vargas Heredia some tobacco. Thanks to a favor from Brigadier José, she gets to see the “torero”. In return Carmen offers the soldier the carnation in her hair. But not without informing everyone that she will sing at Mulero's tavern that night. José comes go to see her. While Carmen sings, another woman steals the carnation José was given by the gipsy before.

Cast
 Imperio Argentina as Carmen
 Rafael Rivelles as José Navarro
 Manuel Luna as Antonio Vargas Heredia
 Pedro Fernández Cuenca as Juan
 Pedro Barreto as Salvador
 Margit Symo as Dolores
 Alberto Romea as Comandante Ramirez
 J. Noé de la Peña as Triqui
 José Prada as Dargento Garcia
 Anselmo Fernández as Miguel
 Juan Laffita Díaz as Mulero
 Julio Roos as Capitán Moraleda
 Ramón Montoya as Guitarrista
 Carlos Montoya as Guitarrista

Influence
The shooting of this Spanish version and the parallel German version are an inspiration for the 1998 Spanish film The Girl of Your Dreams.

References

External links

1938 films
Films of Nazi Germany
German historical musical films
Spanish historical musical films
1930s historical musical films
1930s Spanish-language films
Films based on Carmen
Films directed by Florián Rey
Films set in 1835
Films set in Seville
Spanish multilingual films
German black-and-white films
German multilingual films
Films based on adaptations
Georges Bizet
Spanish black-and-white films
1938 multilingual films
Films about Romani people
1930s German films